Kaushikbhai Kantibhai Vekariya is an Indian politician who is the MLA from Amreli Assembly constituency in the Gujarat Legislative Assembly. He contested the 2022 Gujarat Legislative Assembly election from the Bharatiya Janata Party and became a member.

References 

Living people
Gujarat MLAs 2022–2027
Bharatiya Janata Party politicians from Gujarat
People from Amreli district
1986 births